USS Parthenia (SP-671) was a United States Navy patrol vessel in commission from 1917 to 1919 or 1920.

Parthenia was built as a private steam yacht of the same name by the Herreshoff Manufacturing Company at Bristol, Rhode Island, in 1903. On 15 August 1917, the U.S. Navy purchased her from Colonel Harry E. Converse for use as a section patrol vessel during World War I. Converse delivered her to the Navy on 18 August 1917, and she was commissioned as USS Parthenia (SP-671).

Parthenia performed patrol duty off the United States East Coast, apparently in New England waters, for the rest of World War I and for some time after the end of the war.

Parthenia was sold on 17 August 1920.

References

Department of the Navy Naval History and Heritage Command Online Library of Selected Images: U.S. Navy Ships: USS Parthenia (SP-671), 1917-1920. Originally the civilian steam yacht Parthenia (1903)
NavSource Online: Section Patrol Craft Photo Archive Parthenia (SP 671)

Patrol vessels of the United States Navy
World War I patrol vessels of the United States
Ships built in Bristol, Rhode Island
1903 ships
Individual yachts